Snelli tiik, also Šnelli tiik  is a pond in Estonian capital Tallinn.

See also
List of lakes of Estonia

Lakes of Estonia
Landforms of Tallinn